NetWitness is a network security company that provides real-time network forensics automated threat detection, response, and analysis solutions. The company is based in Bedford, Massachusetts. In 2011, NetWitness was acquired by EMC Corporation and in 2020 was acquired by Symphony Technology Group as a stand alone business unit, part of RSA Security.

History
In the mid-1990s the NetWitness technology was established by CTX Corporation, a Washington D.C. based system integrator.  The technology, initially chartered as a US Government research project, was created to help analysts better understand large volumes of captured network data for various types of investigations. CTX Corporation was subsequently acquired by ManTech International Corporation in December 2002.  At Mantech, the technology was further developed to aid Federal Law Enforcement in criminal investigations and support professional service engagements for the Federal Government and commercial organizations.

In November 2006, NetWitness Corporation was spun out of Mantech, by Nick Lantuh, who was brought in to run the NetWitness Product Group  and execute the spin out.  As an independent company, NetWitness focused on bringing its network analysis technology to the worldwide market.  Since the spin out, NetWitness focused on products to support deep, real-time network situational awareness and agile network response.

In February 2010, NetWitness announced the discovery of a major ZeuS botnet infestation impacting roughly 2,400 companies across the globe. The company dubbed this botnet the “Kneber ZeuS botnet” after the criminal gang involved. This news went viral as it shed light on the continued vulnerabilities of the world’s corporate Information Security practices and provided a deep dive understanding of the inner-workings of a botnet.

NetWitness Visualize, announced in July 2010, provided a new way to visualize network traffic.

In August 2010, NetWitness was named the 21st fastest growing private company in the United States in the annual Inc 500 report. With 7,745.8 percent three year growth, the company was also ranked as the fastest growing privately held enterprise security product company and the fastest growing company in the Washington, D.C. area.

On April 1, 2011, NetWitness was acquired by EMC Corporation for an undisclosed amount. Former NetWitness products were integrated into EMC's security division, RSA Security.

NetWitness’ CEO, Amit Yoran, was formerly Director of the Department of Homeland Security’s National Cyber Security division.

See also

Shawn Carpenter (Principal Analyst)
Amit Yoran
Zeus (malware)
Security information and event management (SIEM)

References

External links
 

Computer security companies
Companies based in Reston, Virginia